Sarah Radcliffe may refer to:

Sarah A. Radcliffe, professor of geography
Sarah Radclyffe, English film producer sometimes credited as Sarah Radcliffe

See also
Sara Radcliffe